Wernya lineofracta is a moth in the family Drepanidae. It was described by Constant Vincent Houlbert in 1921. It is found in the Chinese provinces of Hubei, Hunan and Sichuan.

The wingspan is about 44 mm. The forewings are pale greyish, with a rather pale bluish tint in the central area.

References

Moths described in 1921
Thyatirinae
Moths of Asia